Pakokku Airport  is an airport in Pakokku, Myanmar, administered by the Ministry of Transportation. It is a regional airport in Magway Division. Due to its proximity to Bagan, a UNESCO World Heritage site, the Ministry's Department of Civil Aviation has plans to upgrade Pakokku Airport to an international airport.

Airlines and destinations

Airports in Myanmar